Kuyeh may refer to:
 Kuyeh-ye Olya
 Kuyeh-ye Sofla
 Chinese postal romanization of Guye District, Tangshan, Hebei, China